Esil (Esıl) is a town in northern-central Kazakhstan. The seat of Esil District in Aqmola Region, it is located on the right bank of the Ishim River (known as the Esil in Kazakh). Population:

References

Populated places in Akmola Region